Maharaja Sir Bhim Singh II, KCSI (14 September 1909 – 20 July 1991) was the last ruling Maharaja of the princely state of Kotah from 1940 to 1947.

Early career

The only son and heir of Maharaja Sri Sir Umed Singhji II, Bhim Singhji II succeeded his father following his death in 1940. He immediately entered into service with the British Indian Army as an officer, serving during the Second World War and being promoted to Major by 1948. Although he planned several education and modernisation programs for Kotah, they did not reach fruition before Indian independence. He was knighted with the KCSI in 1947, and signed the Instrument of Accession to the Dominion of India on 15 August. The following year, on 25 March 1948, Sir Bhim Singhji merged Kotah into the Rajasthan Union of states and became its first Rajpramukh, but was demoted to Uprajpramukh (Deputy Rajpramukh) when the Maharana of Udaipur, who was of a higher rank than Sir Bhim Singhji, acceded to the Rajasthan Union. Sir Bhim Singhji continued in the office of Uprajpramukh until it, along with the office of Rajpramukh, was abolished by the Government of India on 31 October 1956.

Later Work

In 1956, Sir Bhim Singhji served as an Alternate Delegate to the United Nations General Assembly that year. Conversely, since 1959 he had been President of the Rajasthan Board for the Preservation of Wildlife.

Sports shooter 

An expert shooter, he was Captain of the Indian shooting team at the Singapore Shooting Championships in 1969, at the 1976 Summer Olympics and at the 1978 Asian Games.

Family

On 30 April 1930, Bhim Singhji II married Rathorji Maharani Shivkumari Sahiba (1 April 1916–), a younger daughter of General Maharaja Sir Ganga Singh of Bikaner. The couple had one son and two daughters:

 Maharajkumar Sri Brijraj Singhji Sahib Bahadur, who succeeded as Maharajadhiraj Maharaja Mahimahendra Maharao Raja Sri Brijraj Singh Sahib Bahadur (21 February 1934–  29 January 2022)
 Maharajkumari Indira Kumari Sahiba (1937–), who in 1960 married Raja Rawat Sri Bikramaditya Singh Sahib Bahadur (18 December 1936–), the Raja of Rajgarh, becoming the Rani Sahiba of Rajgarh.
 Maharajkumari Bhuvaneshwari Kumari Sahiba (29 May 1945–), who married in the 1970s Thakur Sri Devi Singh of Malasar, and had twin daughters Shaivya Rathore and Divya Rathore.

Later years and death

As part of the mass derecognisation of Indian rulers in 1971 under the Indira Gandhi regime, Sir Bhim Singhji was stripped of ruling powers and titles. He died two decades later on 20 July 1991, aged 81, after a reign of 51 years, and was succeeded by his only son, Brijraj Singh.

Titles

1909–1940: Maharajkumar Sri Bhim Singh Sahib Bahadur
1940–1943: His Highness Maharajadhiraj Maharaja Mahimahendra Maharao Raja Sri Bhim Singh II Sahib Bahadur, Maharao Raja of Kotah
1943–1944: Captain His Highness Maharajadhiraj Maharaja Mahimahendra Maharao Raja Sri Bhim Singh II Sahib Bahadur, Maharao Raja of Kotah
1944–1945: Major His Highness Maharajadhiraj Maharaja Mahimahendra Maharao Raja Sri Bhim Singh II Sahib Bahadur, Maharao Raja of Kotah
1945–1946: Lieutenant-Colonel His Highness Maharajadhiraj Maharaja Mahimahendra Maharao Raja Sri Bhim Singh II Sahib Bahadur, Maharao Raja of Kotah
1946–1947: Colonel His Highness Maharajadhiraj Maharaja Mahimahendra Maharao Raja Sri Bhim Singh II Sahib Bahadur, Maharao Raja of Kotah
1947–1948: Colonel His Highness Maharajadhiraj Maharaja Mahimahendra Maharao Raja Sri Sir Bhim Singh II Sahib Bahadur, Maharao Raja of Kotah, KCSI
1948–1991: Brigadier His Highness Maharajadhiraj Maharaja Mahimahendra Maharao Raja Sri Sir Bhim Singh II Sahib Bahadur, Maharao Raja of Kotah, KCSI

Honours

King George V Silver Jubilee Medal-1935
King George VI Coronation Medal-1937
Ganga Singh Golden Jubilee Medal of Bikaner-1937
1939-1945 Star-1945
Africa Star-1945
War Medal 1939-1945-1945
Knight Commander of the Order of the Star of India (KCSI)-1947
Indian Independence Medal-1947
Arjuna Award-1971

References

External links

Indian knights
20th-century Indian royalty
Knights Commander of the Order of the Star of India
1909 births
1991 deaths
Indian male sport shooters
Skeet shooters
Rajasthani people
Recipients of the Arjuna Award
Sport shooters from Rajasthan
Trap and double trap shooters
Olympic shooters of India
People from Kota, Rajasthan
History of Kota, Rajasthan
Kotah, Bhim Singh II
Shooters at the 1978 Asian Games
Rajpramukhs
Asian Games competitors for India
Shooters at the 1976 Summer Olympics